Club Cultural Deportivo Casma (sometimes referred as Cultural Casma) is a Peruvian football club, playing in the city of Casma, Áncash, Peru.

History
The Cultural Casma was founded on September 15, 1941.

In the 2005 Copa Perú, the club classified to the Departamental Stage, but was eliminated by José Gálvez in the semifinals.

In the 2011 Copa Perú, the club participated in the 2011 Liga Superior de Ancash, but was eliminated when finished in 5th place.

Honours

Regional
Liga Departamental de Ancash:
Winners (2): 1984, 1988
Runner-up (2): 1967, 1986

Liga Provincial de Casma:
Winners (7): 1980, 1984, 1988, 2004, 2006, 2008, 2009
Runner-up (2): 2005, 2007

Liga Distrital de Casma:
Winners (15): 1967, 1975, 1980, 1981, 1984, 1987, 1988, 1991, 1992, 2004, 2005, 2006, 2007, 2008, 2010
Runner-up (1): 2009

References

See also
List of football clubs in Peru
Peruvian football league system

Football clubs in Peru
Association football clubs established in 1941
1941 establishments in Peru